Leslie Parkyn (1918–1983) was a British film producer. He helped run Independent Artists, with Julian Wintle.

Select credits
 It Started in Paradise (1952)
 The Little Kidnappers (1953)
 The Woman for Joe (1955)
 Tiger in the Smoke (1956)
 Tiger Bay (1959)
 The White Trap (1959)
 Devil's Bait  (1959)
 Circus of Horrors (1960)
 Play It Cool (1962)
 The Fast Lady (1962)
 Bitter Harvest (1963)
 Father Came Too! (1963)

References

External links
 
 

1918 births
1983 deaths
British film producers